Formula One, abbreviated to F1, is currently the highest class of open-wheeled auto racing defined by the Fédération Internationale de l'Automobile (FIA), motorsport's world governing body. The "formula" in the name refers to a set of rules to which all participants and vehicles must conform. The results of each race are combined to determine two annual championships, one for drivers (World Drivers' Championship), and one for constructors (World Constructors' Championship).

This list is for the circuits that hosted World Championship races from 1950 until now. The terms "Formula One race" and "World Championship race" were not always synonymous throughout history – see  for a detailed explanation.

History

A lot of classic (older) circuits have hosted  using different configurations throughout their history: Nürburgring, Spa-Francorchamps, Monza, etc. Taking Nürburgring as an example, the first World Championship race there used the  configuration, but concerns over safety meant that more recent  have used a shorter, safer circuit. Formula One circuits were predominantly in Europe during the early years of the championship; as the sport has expanded, so has the location of its circuits. The expansion into Asia and America has been a recent occurrence. The Miami International Autodrome became the 76th circuit to host a Grand Prix, when it held the Miami Grand Prix in 2022; this is the latest addition to this list. The Las Vegas Street Circuit is due to host its first Grand Prix in 2023, with the Las Vegas Grand Prix.

As some circuits have hosted  using different configurations, the most recent configuration used is listed in the table below.

Circuits

 The "Circuit" column uses the name contemporary to the last time the circuit was used in Formula One.
 The "Map" column shows a diagram of the latest configuration on current tracks and the last configuration used on past tracks.
 The "Type" column refers to the type of circuit: "street" is a circuit held on closed city streets, "road" refers to a mixture of public roads and a permanent track, and "race" is a permanent facility.
 The "Last length used" shows the track length for the configuration that was used last time the Formula One race was held on a given track.
 The "Direction" column shows the direction for the configuration that was used last time the Formula One race was held on a given track.

Footnotes

References
General
 
 

Specific

External links

 Formula One official website
 FIA official website

Circuits
 
Formula One